The Bone Season is a supernatural dystopian novel by British writer Samantha Shannon and is her debut novel. The novel was published on 20 August 2013 by Bloomsbury Publishing and is the first of a seven book series. Television rights to The Bone Season have been sold to Harriet Hammond's Little Hat Productions. The small screen adaptation of “The Bone Season” is being written, with input from Shannon, by Scottish screenwriter IR Bell-Webb, an alum of the U.K. National Film & TV School who was nominated for a best British short BAFTA Award for co-writing “Slap.” The Bone Season was also named the first book in NBC's Today show's monthly book club.

Of the novel, Shannon stated that she wondered what would happen if "dystopia dealt with the supernatural" and if there were a second Salem Witch Trials.

Plot
The year is 2059. Nineteen-year-old Paige Mahoney is working in the criminal underworld of Scion London, based at Seven Dials, employed by a man named Jaxon Hall. Her job: to scout for information by locating human minds. Paige is a dreamwalker, the rarest type of clairvoyant and, in the world of Scion, she commits treason simply by breathing.

It is raining the day her life changes forever. Attacked, drugged and kidnapped, Paige is transported to Oxford – a city kept secret for two hundred years, controlled by a powerful, otherworldly race. Paige is assigned to Warden, a Rephaite with mysterious motives. He is her master, her trainer, her natural enemy. But, if Paige wants to regain her freedom she must allow herself to be nurtured in this prison where she is meant to die. She must absorb all the knowledge she gains access to, she must hone her gift.

Development
Shannon began writing The Bone Season while working for book agent David Godwin and attending St Anne's College, Oxford. She had started working for Godwin when he offered her an internship after he declined her earlier novel Aurora. After some time looking over manuscripts and gaining experience in the book business, Shannon came up with the premise for The Bone Season. Shannon imagined "a girl, having the exact same day at work that I was, but she happened to be clairvoyant" and began planning the novel while on her lunch break. She began using the environment of St Anne's College and the overall University of Oxford architecture and landscaping as an inspiration for the novel's Sheol I penal colony setting. An interviewer noted that Oxford has many "impossibly neat, manicured lawns and well-tended buildings that act as a kind of tree-ring-dating window onto Britain's architectural past (and present)." Shannon came up with the idea of a shanty town in between the colleges as a way of "juxtaposing the squalor the humans were forced to live in and the grand colleges where The Rephaim live on either side."

Reception
Prior to the release of The Bone Season the book was compared to J.K. Rowling's Harry Potter series and Shannon was often referred to as "the next J.K. Rowling". Newspapers drew comparisons due to Shannon signing with the same UK publisher as Rowling did for her Harry Potter series and due to both series comprising seven novels. However Atlantic Wire reporter John Arit commented that the "steady drumbeat of press ... has led to comparisons to nearly every mainstream female fantasy and sci-fi novelist with name recognition".

Critical reception for the book has been mostly positive. USA Today commented upon a similarity to the Harry Potter novels in their positive review for The Bone Season, opining that the book's premise was "awfully familiar in certain aspects" to the aforementioned series while also stating that it 
had "fresh ideas, excellent original concepts and, best of all, an impressive new voice for fantasy literature." NPR also noted the same comparison, but remarked that it was more similar to The Hunger Games than the Potter series. The Telegraph's review also mentioned that the book was similar to The Hunger Games and commented that the plot would be familiar to fantasy readers but that Shannon "shows real skill in combining them so easily into an original and enjoyably escapist fictional world."

Series
Prequel novella, The Pale Dreamer, was released as an e-book in 2016. The second installment, The Mime Order was released on 27 January 2015.
The third installment, The Song Rising was released on 7 March 2017. In 2020 Shannon released an additional e-book novella, The Dawn Chorus, set between the third and fourth novels. The fourth installment was released January 26, 2021 and it is called The Mask Falling.

In April 2021 Shannon confirmed that work was underway on an untitled fifth installment, with publication expected in 2024. The completed series is expected to have a total of seven novels, with the sixth installment expected to be published in 2026. 

Supplementary work On the Merits of Unnaturalness, being an extraordinary treatise upon the Seven Orders of Clairvoyance, was published in 2016.

References

External links
 
 Janet Maslin's not-so-laudatory review in the New York Times

2013 British novels
2013 debut novels
Fiction set in 2059
Dystopian novels
Novels set in Oxford
Novels set in the future
Bloomsbury Publishing books